In mathematics, a finite topological space is a topological space for which the underlying point set is finite. That is, it is a topological space which has only finitely many elements.

Finite topological spaces are often used to provide examples of interesting phenomena or counterexamples to plausible sounding conjectures. William Thurston has called the study of finite topologies in this sense "an oddball topic that can
lend good insight to a variety of questions".

Topologies on a finite set
Let  be a finite set.
 if  then .
 if  then .

Since the power set of a finite set is finite there can be only finitely many open sets (and only finitely many closed sets). 

Examples

0 or 1 points

There is a unique topology on the empty set ∅. The only open set is the empty one. Indeed, this is the only subset of ∅.

Likewise, there is a unique topology on a singleton set {a}. Here the open sets are ∅ and {a}. This topology is both discrete and trivial, although in some ways it is better to think of it as a discrete space since it shares more properties with the family of finite discrete spaces.

For any topological space X there is a unique continuous function from ∅ to X, namely the empty function. There is also a unique continuous function from X to the singleton space {a}, namely the constant function to a. In the language of category theory the empty space serves as an initial object in the category of topological spaces while the singleton space serves as a terminal object.

2 points

Let X = {a,b} be a set with 2 elements. There are four distinct topologies on X:
{∅, {a,b}} (the trivial topology)
{∅, {a}, {a,b}}
{∅, {b}, {a,b}}
{∅, {a}, {b}, {a,b}} (the discrete topology)

The second and third topologies above are easily seen to be homeomorphic. The function from X to itself which swaps a and b is a homeomorphism. A topological space homeomorphic to one of these is called a Sierpiński space. So, in fact, there are only three inequivalent topologies on a two-point set: the trivial one, the discrete one, and the Sierpiński topology.

The specialization preorder on the Sierpiński space {a,b} with {b} open is given by: a ≤ a, b ≤ b, and a ≤ b.

3 points

Let X = {a,b,c} be a set with 3 elements. There are 29 distinct topologies on X but only 9 inequivalent topologies:
{∅, {a,b,c}}
{∅, {c}, {a,b,c}}
{∅, {a,b}, {a,b,c}}
{∅, {c}, {a,b}, {a,b,c}}
{∅, {c}, {b,c}, {a,b,c}} (T0)
{∅, {c}, {a,c}, {b,c}, {a,b,c}} (T0)
{∅, {a}, {b}, {a,b}, {a,b,c}} (T0)
{∅, {b}, {c}, {a,b}, {b,c}, {a,b,c}} (T0)
{∅, {a}, {b}, {c}, {a,b}, {a,c}, {b,c}, {a,b,c}} (T0)

The last 5 of these are all T0. The first one is trivial, while in 2, 3, and 4 the points a and b are topologically indistinguishable.

4 points

Let X = {a,b,c,d} be a set with 4 elements. There are 355 distinct topologies on X but only 33 inequivalent topologies:

{∅, {a, b, c, d}}
{∅, {a, b, c}, {a, b, c, d}}
{∅, {a}, {a, b, c, d}}
{∅, {a}, {a, b, c}, {a, b, c, d}}
{∅, {a, b}, {a, b, c, d}}
{∅, {a, b}, {a, b, c}, {a, b, c, d}}
{∅, {a}, {a, b}, {a, b, c, d}}
{∅, {a}, {b}, {a, b}, {a, b, c, d}}
{∅, {a, b, c}, {d}, {a, b, c, d}}
{∅, {a}, {a, b, c}, {a, d}, {a, b, c, d}}
{∅, {a}, {a, b, c}, {d}, {a, d}, {a, b, c, d}}
{∅, {a}, {b, c}, {a, b, c}, {a, d}, {a, b, c, d}}
{∅, {a, b}, {a, b, c}, {a, b, d}, {a, b, c, d}}
{∅, {a, b}, {c}, {a, b, c}, {a, b, c, d}}
{∅, {a, b}, {c}, {a, b, c}, {a, b, d}, {a, b, c, d}}
{∅, {a, b}, {c}, {a, b, c}, {d}, {a, b, d}, {c, d}, {a, b, c, d}}
{∅, {b, c}, {a, d}, {a, b, c, d}}
{∅, {a}, {a, b}, {a, b, c}, {a, b, d}, {a, b, c, d}} (T0)
{∅, {a}, {a, b}, {a, c}, {a, b, c}, {a, b, c, d}} (T0)
{∅, {a}, {b}, {a, b}, {a, c}, {a, b, c}, {a, b, c, d}} (T0)
{∅, {a}, {a, b}, {a, b, c}, {a, b, c, d}} (T0)
{∅, {a}, {b}, {a, b}, {a, b, c}, {a, b, c, d}} (T0)
{∅, {a}, {a, b}, {c}, {a, c}, {a, b, c}, {a, b, d}, {a, b, c, d}} (T0)
{∅, {a}, {a, b}, {a, c}, {a, b, c}, {a, b, d}, {a, b, c, d}} (T0)
{∅, {a}, {b}, {a, b}, {a, b, c}, {a, b, d}, {a, b, c, d}} (T0)
{∅, {a}, {b}, {a, b}, {a, c}, {a, b, c}, {a, b, d}, {a, b, c, d}} (T0)
{∅, {a}, {b}, {a, b}, {b, c}, {a, b, c}, {a, d}, {a, b, d}, {a, b, c, d}} (T0)
{∅, {a}, {a, b}, {a, c}, {a, b, c}, {a, d}, {a, b, d}, {a, c, d}, {a, b, c, d}} (T0)
{∅, {a}, {b}, {a, b}, {a, c}, {a, b, c}, {a, d}, {a, b, d}, {a, c, d}, {a, b, c, d}} (T0)
{∅, {a}, {b}, {a, b}, {c}, {a, c}, {b, c}, {a, b, c}, {a, b, d}, {a, b, c, d}} (T0)
{∅, {a}, {b}, {a, b}, {c}, {a, c}, {b, c}, {a, b, c}, {a, d}, {a, b, d}, {a, c, d}, {a, b, c, d}} (T0)
{∅, {a}, {b}, {a, b}, {c}, {a, c}, {b, c}, {a, b, c}, {a, b, c, d}} (T0)
{∅, {a}, {b}, {a, b}, {c}, {a, c}, {b, c}, {a, b, c}, {d}, {a, d}, {b, d}, {a, b, d}, {c, d}, {a, c, d}, {b, c, d}, {a, b, c, d}} (T0)

The last 16 of these are all T0.

Properties

Specialization preorder

Topologies on a finite set X are in one-to-one correspondence with preorders on X. Recall that a preorder on X is a binary relation on X which is reflexive and transitive.

Given a (not necessarily finite) topological space X we can define a preorder on X by
x ≤ y if and only if x ∈ cl{y}
where cl{y} denotes the closure of the singleton set {y}. This preorder is called the specialization preorder on X. Every open set U of X will be an upper set with respect to ≤ (i.e. if x ∈ U and x ≤ y then y ∈ U). Now if X is finite, the converse is also true: every upper set is open in X. So for finite spaces, the topology on X is uniquely determined by ≤.

Going in the other direction, suppose (X, ≤) is a preordered set. Define a topology τ on X by taking the open sets to be the upper sets with respect to ≤. Then the relation ≤ will be the specialization preorder of (X, τ). The topology defined in this way is called the Alexandrov topology determined by ≤.

The equivalence between preorders and finite topologies can be interpreted as a version of Birkhoff's representation theorem, an equivalence between finite distributive lattices (the lattice of open sets of the topology) and partial orders (the partial order of equivalence classes of the preorder). This correspondence also works for a larger class of spaces called finitely generated spaces. Finitely generated spaces can be characterized as the spaces in which an arbitrary intersection of open sets is open. Finite topological spaces are a special class of finitely generated spaces.

Compactness and countability

Every finite topological space is compact since any open cover must already be finite. Indeed, compact spaces are often thought of as a generalization of finite spaces since they share many of the same properties.

Every finite topological space is also second-countable (there are only finitely many open sets) and separable (since the space itself is countable).

Separation axioms

If a finite topological space is T1 (in particular, if it is Hausdorff) then it must, in fact, be discrete. This is because the complement of a point is a finite union of closed points and therefore closed. It follows that each point must be open.

Therefore, any finite topological space which is not discrete cannot be T1, Hausdorff, or anything stronger.

However, it is possible for a non-discrete finite space to be T0. In general, two points x and y are topologically indistinguishable if and only if x ≤ y and y ≤ x, where ≤ is the specialization preorder on X. It follows that a space X is T0 if and only if the specialization preorder ≤ on X is a partial order. There are numerous partial orders on a finite set. Each defines a unique T0 topology.

Similarly, a space is R0 if and only if the specialization preorder is an equivalence relation. Given any equivalence relation on a finite set X the associated topology is the partition topology on X. The equivalence classes will be the classes of topologically indistinguishable points. Since the partition topology is pseudometrizable, a finite space is R0 if and only if it is completely regular.

Non-discrete finite spaces can also be normal. The excluded point topology on any finite set is a completely normal T0 space which is non-discrete.

Connectivity

Connectivity in a finite space X is best understood by considering the specialization preorder ≤ on X. We can associate to any preordered set X a directed graph Γ by taking the points of X as vertices and drawing an edge x → y whenever x ≤ y. The connectivity of a finite space X can be understood by considering the connectivity of the associated graph Γ.

In any topological space, if x ≤ y then there is a path from x to y. One can simply take f(0) = x and f(t) = y for t > 0. It is easily to verify that f is continuous. It follows that the path components of a finite topological space are precisely the (weakly) connected components of the associated graph Γ. That is, there is a topological path from x to y if and only if there is an undirected path between the corresponding vertices of Γ.

Every finite space is locally path-connected since the set

is a path-connected open neighborhood of x that is contained in every other neighborhood. In other words, this single set forms a local base at x.

Therefore, a finite space is connected if and only if it is path-connected. The connected components are precisely the path components. Each such component is both closed and open in X.

Finite spaces may have stronger connectivity properties. A finite space X is
hyperconnected if and only if there is a greatest element with respect to the specialization preorder. This is an element whose closure is the whole space X.
ultraconnected if and only if there is a least element with respect to the specialization preorder. This is an element whose only neighborhood is the whole space X.
For example, the particular point topology on a finite space is hyperconnected while the excluded point topology is ultraconnected. The Sierpiński space is both.

Additional structure

A finite topological space is pseudometrizable if and only if it is R0. In this case, one possible pseudometric is given by

where x ≡ y means x and y are topologically indistinguishable. A finite topological space is metrizable if and only if it is discrete.

Likewise, a topological space is uniformizable if and only if it is R0. The uniform structure will be the pseudometric uniformity induced by the above pseudometric.

Algebraic topology

Perhaps surprisingly, there are finite topological spaces with nontrivial fundamental groups. A simple example is the pseudocircle, which is space X with four points, two of which are open and two of which are closed. There is a continuous map from the unit circle S1 to X which is a weak homotopy equivalence (i.e. it induces an isomorphism of homotopy groups). It follows that the fundamental group of the pseudocircle is infinite cyclic.

More generally it has been shown that for any finite abstract simplicial complex K, there is a finite topological space XK and a weak homotopy equivalence f : |K| → XK where |K| is the geometric realization of K. It follows that the homotopy groups of |K| and XK are isomorphic.  In fact, the underlying set of XK can be taken to be K itself, with the topology associated to the inclusion partial order.

Number of topologies on a finite set

As discussed above, topologies on a finite set are in one-to-one correspondence with preorders on the set, and T0 topologies are in one-to-one correspondence with partial orders. Therefore, the number of topologies on a finite set is equal to the number of preorders and the number of T0 topologies is equal to the number of partial orders.

The table below lists the number of distinct (T0) topologies on a set with n elements. It also lists the number of inequivalent (i.e. nonhomeomorphic) topologies.

Let T(n) denote the number of distinct topologies on a set with n points. There is no known simple formula to compute T(n) for arbitrary n. The Online Encyclopedia of Integer Sequences presently lists T(n) for n ≤ 18.

The number of distinct T0 topologies on a set with n points, denoted T0(n), is related to T(n) by the formula

where S(n,k) denotes the Stirling number of the second kind.

See also

Finite geometry
Finite metric space
Topological combinatorics

References

External links

Topological spaces
Combinatorics